Philyrophyllum is a genus of African plants in the family Asteraceae.

 Species
 Philyrophyllum brandbergense P.P.J.Herman - Namibia
 Philyrophyllum schinzii O.Hoffm. - South Africa, Namibia, Botswana, Zimbabwe

References

Athroismeae
Asteraceae genera
Flora of Southern Africa